Gnathoenia flavovariegata is a species of beetle in the family Cerambycidae. It was described by Stephan von Breuning in 1935. It is known from the Ivory Coast, Ghana, and Sierra Leone.

References

Ceroplesini
Beetles described in 1935